'Ariyanayagipuram(அரியநாயகிபுரம்)'  is a Gram panchayat in Tirunelveli district (also known as Nellai district) located in Kadayanallur Taluk in the Indian state of Tamil Nadu. Native languages include, but are not limited to, the following: Tamil, Malayalam, Telugu, English and Hindi.

Education
While there are several schools within the vicinity of Ariyanayagipuram, only one school is located directly within the city: H.N.U.C. Hr. Sec. School (Hindu Nadar Uravin Murai Committee Higher Secondary School). Approximately 8 villages study in Ariyanayagipuram's school. However, there are several engineering and arts colleges located in the surrounding areas.

Other schools near Ariyanayagipuram: 

Hindu Nadar Uravin Murai Committee HR Sec School
 Jamila Nursery School
 Govt School Thiruvattanallur	
 Sandror School	
 Santroe School
 Sardar Raja College of Engineering, Alangulam
 S.Veerasamy Chettiyar Group of Institutions, Puliyangudi
 Mano Arts & Science College, Puliangudi
 J.P Engineering College, Aigudi, Tenkasi
 MSPVL Polytechnic College, Pavoorchatram
 Einstein College of Engg, Seethaparbanallur, Alankulam
 Parasakthi Arts & Science College for Women, Courtallam, Tenkasi
 Govt.Arts & Science College, Surandai
 Laksmi ITI, Puliyangudi
 Sri Meenakshi B.Ed College, Puliyangudi

Geography
Ariyanayagipuram is located in the Tirunelveli district, the southernmost part of India. It encompasses the bottom tip of the country, and the coastline extends up the eastern side, 9.10 degrees N,77.42 degrees E.

Railways
The railways within the area are majestic looking structures with a high elevated facade. Pambakovilsandy(PBKS) railway station is located in the northern side of Ariyanayagipuram. It is connected to major cities in all directions, namely Madurai/Virudhunagar to the north and Tenkasi/Kollam to the west.

References
 Ariyanayagipuram School, mapio
 Ariyanayagipuram, Sankarankovil Village information, soki.in - Villages in India

outlookindia.com

Villages in Tirunelveli district